was a Japanese field marshal and one of the leaders of Japan's military throughout most of World War II. As Army Minister in 1937, Sugiyama was a driving force behind the launch of hostilities against China in retaliation for the Marco Polo Bridge Incident. After being named the Army’s Chief of Staff in 1940, he became a leading advocate for expansion into Southeast Asia and preventive war against the United States. Upon the outbreak of hostilities in the Pacific, Sugiyama served as the army’s commander-in-chief until his removal by Prime Minister Hideki Tojo in February 1944. Following Tojo's ouster in July 1944, he once again held the post of Army Minister in Kuniaki Koiso's cabinet until its dissolution in April 1945. Ten days after Japan's surrender on 2 September 1945, he committed suicide.

Early life and career

Born to a former samurai family from Kokura (now part of Kitakyushu City), Fukuoka Prefecture, Sugiyama graduated from the 12th class of the Imperial Japanese Army Academy in 1901. He served as a junior officer with 3rd Battalion of the 14th Regiment of the IJA 12th Division in the Russo-Japanese War, and was wounded in the face during the Battle of Shaho. Due to scars from that injury, he was unable to fully open his right eye.

After graduating from the 22nd class of the Army Staff College in 1910, Sugiyama served in Section 2 (Intelligence) within the Imperial Japanese Army General Staff.  He was posted as military attaché to the Philippines and Singapore in 1912, disguised as a civilian trading company employee, and disguised as an Imperial Japanese Navy lieutenant, joined in an inspection tour of the United States Navy base at Subic Bay. Promoted to major in 1913, he was posted again as military attaché to British India in 1915, where he met in secret with Indian independence activists Rash Behari Bose and Subhas Chandra Bose. In 1918, he was sent as a military observer to the Middle Eastern theatre of World War I. At the end of the war, he served on the League of Nations committee on military aviation.

On his return to Japan, Sugiyama was promoted to lieutenant colonel, and commander of the 2nd Air Battalion in December 1918. Three years later in 1921, he was promoted to colonel. A strong proponent of military aviation, he ultimately rose to become the first head of the Imperial Japanese Army Air Service in 1922.

Rise to power

Involvement in Army politics
In 1924, Sugiyama became a protege of Army Minister Ugaki Kazushige.  Subsequently,  he was promoted to major general in May 1925 and appointed Director of the Bureau of Military Affairs in 1928. Within the same timeframe, he also became a leading member of the Army's Control Faction. 

In 1931, he participated in the March incident, a failed coup-d'etat which attempted to make Ugaki Prime Minister. Later that year, as Under Secretary of the Army, he made an official announcement defending the actions of the military in the Mukden Incident.

With the rise of  the rival Kōdōha faction under Sadao Araki to the post of Army Minister, Sugiyama was sidelined to the Imperial Japanese Army Air Service in March 1933. However, the failed coup d'etat of the February 26 incident in 1936 led to a purge of the Kōdōha from positions of authority and Sugiyama was promoted to full general in November 1936.

Army Minister

In February 1937, Sugiyama became Army Minister in the cabinet of Prime Minister Senjūrō Hayashi and remained in that position under the succeeding Prime Minister, Fumimaro Konoe.

During his tenure, tensions between Japanese forces and the Chinese grew more severe. When hostilities broke out near the Marco Polo Bridge, Sugiyama  pushed Konoe for retaliation against China, thereby giving rise to the Second Sino-Japanese War..

Promotion to Army leadership
On 3 June 1938, Sugiyama left his position as Army Minister to become a member of Japan's Supreme War Council. In December 1938, he briefly left the Council to assume command over the North China Area Army and the Mongolia Garrison Army respectively before returning in September 1939.

By September 3, 1940, Hajime Sugiyama succeeded the elderly Prince Kan'in Kotohito as Chief of the Imperial Japanese Army General Staff.

World War II

 On the eve of the Second World War's expansion into Asia and the Pacific, General Sugiyama was one of the leading Army officers lobbying for war with the West. On September 5, 1941, Emperor Hirohito challenged his confidence in a quick victory over the Western powers by berating him for erroneously predicting in 1937 that Japan's invasion of China would be completed within three months. Nonetheless, by 1 December 1941, the Emperor ultimately gave his imperial sanction for war. 

Following the war’s outbreak, Sugiyama was responsible for directing the Army’s ensuing military operations. In a matter of months, the Empire of Japan conquered a broad swathe of territory in Southeast Asia and the western Pacific including Malaya, the Dutch East Indies, Burma, and the Philippines. 

By the beginning of 1943, the tide of the conflict had turned against the Japanese after their forces were decisively defeated at the battles of Midway and Guadalcanal. In the same year, Sugiyama was awarded the honorary rank of field marshal. 

As the war fronts collapsed on all sides, Sugiyama was relieved of his post as Chief of the General Staff on February 21, 1944, by General Hideki Tōjō (who continued to serve concurrently as Prime Minister). Shortly thereafter, he was appointed to the Inspector-general of Military Training, which was still one of the most prestigious positions in the Army. 

After Tōjō's ouster in 1944, Sugiyama again became Army Minister in the new cabinet of Prime Minister Kuniaki Koiso. In July 1945, he was asked to take command of the First General Army, which directed defenses of eastern half Japanese mainland against the anticipated Allied invasion.

Ten days after the surrender of Japan, after finishing preparations for the final dissolution of the Imperial Japanese Army as dictated by the victorious Allied Powers, Sugiyama committed suicide by shooting himself four times in the chest with his revolver while seated at his desk in his office. At home, his wife also killed herself. His grave is at the Tama Cemetery, in Fuchū, Tokyo.

References

Notes

Books

External links

 
 
 

|-

1880 births
1945 deaths
Military personnel from Fukuoka Prefecture
Japanese generals
Japanese military personnel of World War II
Marshals of Japan
Ministers of the Imperial Japanese Army
Japanese military personnel who committed suicide
People from Kitakyushu
Japanese military personnel of the Russo-Japanese War
Suicides by firearm in Japan
Recipients of the Order of the Golden Kite
Recipients of the Order of the Rising Sun
Japanese anti-communists
Imperial Japanese Army officers